AZS AWFiS Gdańsk were a men's handball club from Gdańsk, Poland. AZS AWFiS spent six seasons in the Superliga, Poland's highest league, before being dissolved in 2010.

History
AZS AWFiS Gdańsk were the handball section of the Academy of Physical Education and Sport Jędrzej Śniadeckiego in Gdańsk, eventually becoming professional and rising through the leagues. AZS AWFiS first played in the Superliga for the 2003–04 season, eventually going on to finish 8th. After 9th and 10th finishes in the following seasons, AZS AWFiS were immediately promoted to the top division and spent a further 3 seasons in the Superliga. The club's greatest success was in the 2008–09 season when the club achieved a 6th place finish, and the first time they had finished in the top half of the table. However, their success was short-lived, and the following season the club finished 11th and were relegated. With the club and players being unable to reach agreements on wages the board members decided to dissolve the club.

Honours

Superliga: 6th place; 2008–09 (highest finish)

Polish Cup: Quarterfinal; 2008–09 (highest result)

Superliga seasons

References

Polish handball clubs
Sport in Gdańsk